Anna Tsuchiya Inspi' Nana (Black Stones) is an album released by rock recording artist Anna Tsuchiya. It was released on Mad Pray Records, February 28, 2007. It is both a soundtrack for the NANA anime, as well as her second solo studio album.

Tracklist

CD

DVD
The 10-minute DVD bonus includes video clips as well as a performance. 
 NANA SPECIAL STREET LIVE at Shinjuku Station Square25th June2006
 01. rose
 02. zero
 Kuroi Namida -BLACK STONES original animation clip (Studio Live TV size ver)-

2007 albums
Anna Tsuchiya albums
Avex Group albums